In mathematics, the field  of logarithmic-exponential transseries is a non-Archimedean ordered differential field which extends comparability of asymptotic growth rates of elementary nontrigonometric functions to a much broader class of objects. Each log-exp transseries represents a formal asymptotic behavior, and it can be manipulated formally, and when it converges (or in every case if using special semantics such as through infinite surreal numbers), corresponds to actual behavior. Transseries can also be convenient for representing functions.  Through their inclusion of exponentiation and logarithms, transseries are a strong generalization of the power series at infinity and other similar asymptotic expansions.

The field  was introduced independently by Dahn-Göring and Ecalle in the respective contexts of model theory or exponential fields and of the study of analytic singularity and proof by Ecalle of the Dulac conjectures. It constitutes a formal object, extending the field of exp-log functions of Hardy and the field of accelerando-summable series of Ecalle.

The field  enjoys a rich structure: an ordered field with a notion of generalized series and sums, with a compatible derivation with distinguished antiderivation, compatible exponential and logarithm functions and a notion of formal composition of series.

Examples and counter-examples 

Informally speaking, exp-log transseries are well-based (i.e. reverse well-ordered) formal Hahn series of real powers of the positive infinite indeterminate , exponentials, logarithms and their compositions, with real coefficients. Two important additional conditions are that the exponential and logarithmic depth of an exp-log transseries  that is the maximal numbers of iterations of exp and log occurring in  must be finite.

The following formal series are log-exp transseries:

The following formal series are not log-exp transseries:

 — this series is not well-based.
 — the logarithmic depth of this series is infinite
 — the exponential and logarithmic depths of this series are infinite

Introduction 

A remarkable fact is that asymptotic growth rates of elementary nontrigonometric functions and even all functions definable in the model theoretic structure  of the ordered exponential field of real numbers are all comparable: 

The field of transseries can be intuitively viewed as a formal generalization of these growth rates:  In addition to the elementary operations, transseries are closed under "limits" for appropriate sequences with bounded exponential and logarithmic depth.  However, a complication is that growth rates are non-Archimedean and hence do not have the least upper bound property.  We can address this by associating a sequence with the least upper bound of minimal complexity, analogously to construction of surreal numbers.  For example,  is associated with  rather than  because  decays too quickly, and if we identify fast decay with complexity, it has greater complexity than necessary (also, because we care only about asymptotic behavior, pointwise convergence is not dispositive).

Because of the comparability, transseries do not include oscillatory growth rates (such as ). On the other hand, there are transseries such as  that do not directly correspond to convergent series or real valued functions. There are ways to construct fields of generalized transseries including formal transexponential terms, for instance formal solutions  of the Abel equation .

Formal construction 

Transseries can be defined as formal (potentially infinite) expressions, with rules defining which expressions are valid, comparison of transseries, arithmetic operations, and even differentiation. Appropriate transseries can then be assigned to corresponding functions or germs, but there are subtleties involving convergence. Even transseries that diverge can often be meaningfully (and uniquely) assigned actual growth rates (that agree with the formal operations on transseries) using accelero-summation, which is a generalization of Borel summation.

Transseries can be formalized in several equivalent ways; we use one of the simplest ones here.

A transseries is a well-based sum, 

 

The sum might be infinite or transfinite; it is usually written in the order of decreasing .

Here, well-based means that there is no infinite ascending sequence  (see well-ordering).

A monic transmonomial is one of 1, x, log x, log log x, ..., epurely_large_transseries.

 Note: Because , we do not include it as a primitive, but many authors do; log-free transseries do not include  but  is permitted. Also, circularity in the definition is avoided because the purely_large_transseries (above) will have lower exponential depth; the definition works by recursion on the exponential depth. See "Log-exp transseries as iterated Hahn series" (below) for a construction that uses  and explicitly separates different stages.

A purely large transseries is a nonempty transseries  with every .

Transseries have finite exponential depth, where each level of nesting of e or log increases depth by 1 (so we cannot have x + log x + log log x + ...).

Addition of transseries is termwise:  (absence of a term is equated with a zero coefficient).

Comparison:

X > Y iff X − Y is positive.

Comparison of monic transmonomials:

  – these are the only equalities in our construction.
 
  iff  (also ).

Multiplication:
 
 

This essentially applies the distributive law to the product; because the series is well-based, the inner sum is always finite.

Differentiation:

 
 
 
  (division is defined using multiplication).

With these definitions, transseries is an ordered differential field.

Other constructions

Log-exp transseries as iterated Hahn series

Log-free transseries

Those are transseries which exclude any logarithmic term.

Inductive definition:

For  we will define a linearly ordered multiplicative group of monomials . We then let  denote the field of well-based series . This is the set of maps  with well-based (i.e. reverse well-ordered) support, equipped with pointwise sum and Cauchy product (see Hahn series). In , we distinguish the (non-unital) subring  of purely large transseries, which are series whose support contains only monomials lying strictly above .

We start with  equipped with the product  and the order .

This forms a linearly ordered commutative group under the product  and the lexicographic order  if and only if  or ( and ).

The natural inclusion of  into  given by identifying  and  inductively provides a natural embedding of  into , and thus a natural embedding of  into . We may then define the linearly ordered commutative group  and the ordered field  which is the field of log-free transseries.

Indeed, every series  in  has a bounded exponential depth, i.e. the least positive integer  such that , whereas the series 

 

has no such bound.

Exponentiation on :

The field of log-free transseries is equipped with an exponential function which is a specific morphism . Then the formal Hahn sum 

 

Right-composition with :

A right composition  with the series  can be defined by induction on the exponential depth by 

 

It follows inductively that monomials are preserved by  so at each inductive step the sums are well-based and thus well defined.

Log-exp transseries

Definition:

The function  defined above is not onto  so the logarithm is only partially defined on : for instance the series  has no logarithm.

For  let  denote the set of formal expressions  where . We turn this into an ordered group by defining , and defining  when . We define . If  and  we embed  into  by identifying an element  with the term 

We then obtain  as the directed union 

Exponential and logarithm:

The formal Hahn sum 

 

We define . We finally set

Using surreal numbers

Direct construction of log-exp transseries

One may also define the field of log-exp transseries as a subfield of the ordered field  of surreal numbers. The field  is equipped with Gonshor-Kruskal's exponential and logarithm functions and with its natural structure of field of well-based series under Conway normal form.

Other fields of transseries

 

Additional properties

Operations on transseries

Operations on the differential exponential ordered field

Transseries have very strong closure properties, and many operations can be defined on transseries:
 Log-exp transseries form an exponentially closed ordered field: the exponential and logarithmic functions are total. For example:

 Logarithm is defined for positive arguments.
 Log-exp transseries are real-closed.

Note 1. The last two properties mean that  is Liouville closed.

Note 2. Just like an elementary nontrigonometric function, each positive infinite transseries  has integral exponentiality, even in this strong sense: 

Composition of transseries

Properties
We also have . 
 Unicity: the composition is unique to satisfy the two previous properties.
 Taylor expansions: each log-exp transseries  has a Taylor expansion around every point in the sense that for every  and for sufficiently small , we have 
 
where the sum is a formal Hahn sum of a summable family. 

Decidability and model theory

Theory of differential ordered valued differential field
  is an ordered valued differential field.
 
 
 
 
 Intermediate value property (IVP): 

where P is a differential polynomial, i.e. a polynomial in 

Theory of ordered exponential field

Hardy fields 

Without defining accelero-summation, we note that when operations on convergent transseries produce a divergent one while the same operations on the corresponding germs produce a valid germ, we can then associate the divergent transseries with that germ.

A Hardy field is said maximal if it is properly contained in no Hardy field. By an application of Zorn's lemma, every Hardy field is contained in a maximal Hardy field. Logarithmic-transseries do not themselves correspond to a maximal Hardy field for not every transseries corresponds to a real function, and maximal Hardy fields always contain transsexponential functions.

See also 

 Formal power series
 Hahn series
 Exponentially closed field
 Hardy field

References 

 .
 .

Asymptotic analysis
Mathematical series
Exponentials
Logarithms